The Netherlands Indies gulden, later the Netherlands Indies roepiah, was the currency issued by the Japanese occupiers in the Dutch East Indies between 1942 and 1945. It was subdivided into 100 sen and replaced the gulden at par.

History

Background
In December 1941, the Empire of Japan began its assault on British Borneo; by January 1942 its armies had begun to attack those parts of the island which were part of the Dutch East Indies. This was followed by attacks on Sumatra and Java in February. Ultimately, the Dutch colonial government capitulated on 8 March 1942, though pockets of resistance lasted for several months. In the succeeding months, the Japanese government closed the banks, seized assets and currency, and assumed control of the Indies' economy.

Java was left under the administration of the Sixteenth Army, Sumatra under the Twenty-Fifth Army, and the remainder of the archipelago under the Japanese Navy. This administrative division meant that some notes were highly localized. For instance, the 100 and 1000 gulden notes, with a design similar to that used in occupied Malaya (also under the Twenty-Fifth Army), were only meant to be circulated in Sumatra. There is no evidence, however, that the latter were actually in use.

Occupation
The Japanese occupation government immediately began issuing military banknotes for use in the occupied Indies, as had previously been done in other occupied territories. These first banknotes were printed in Japan, and issued by the Ministry of Finance. This issue formally retained the gulden name, though in common indigene parlance it was called oeang Djepang (Japanese money) or oeang pisang (banana money, for the prominent bananas on the ten gulden note). Each gulden (or, later, roepiah) consisted of 100 cents (sen).

After the occupation began, the Japanese military government ruled that, as of 11 March 1942, the only valid currency in the region were military banknotes and existing colonial gulden. Soon, however, they had begun replacing the pre-war currency at par. They soon required that all extant Dutch currency be exchanged for the occupation issue. This policy, however, was not implemented very strictly, and pre-war currency was widely hoarded, even in the internment camps.

After the Battle of Timor, the Japanese decreed, through their "Edital of 24 February 1942", that the gulden also circulate in Portuguese Timor, replacing the Timorese pataca.

In March 1943, the Japanese occupation government ceased issuing military notes; at the time, military currency to the value of 353 million gulden was in circulation. Printing operations were moved to Kolff in Batavia (now Jakarta), Java. These banknotes, which experienced no change in appearance, were issued by the Southern Development Bank (SDB), which had been established the preceding year and was managed by Yokohama Specie Bank and Bank of Taiwan.

Under the SDB, an increasingly large amount of currency was issued; the professor  writes that, by the end of 1943, the total circulation had almost doubled to 674 million gulden, reaching almost two billion by the end of 1944. This increase in circulation was followed by a drastic increase in inflation. Ultimately, this currency, renamed the roepiah for the 1944 issue, was widely used but highly depreciated.

Post-surrender
The Japanese forces surrendered on 15 August, and two days later the Republic of Indonesia proclaimed its independence. Initially, the widely available Japanese-issued roepiah were accepted as legal tender, together with the pre-war gulden, in both areas controlled by the Netherlands and those under Republican rule; indeed, the Netherlands Indies Civil Administration (NICA) printed more to deal with the costs of reestablishing Dutch administration in the area, though this also led to a continued increase in inflation. Japanese issued notes were not, however, at par with pre-war gulden; in Java, the exchange rate was 10:1 to 12:1.

On 6 March 1946, Dutch-controlled areas replaced the Japanese-issue roepiah with the NICA-issued gulden, giving an official exchange rate of 3 NICA gulden to 100 Japanese roepiah. The Republican government followed suit on 30 October 1946, replacing the occupation currency with Oeang Repoeblik Indonesia (ORI) at an official rate of 50 Japanese roepiah for 1 ORI. However, owing to the ongoing Indonesian National Revolution and the resulting chaotic monetary landscape, Japanese-issued bills remained in use into 1949.

The Indonesian Minister of Finance, Alexander Andries Maramis, estimated in 1946 that the Japanese had put some 2.2 billion roepiah into circulation by the end of the occupation. Shibata gives a considerably higher amount, over 3.1 billion. The Australian historian Robert Cribb, meanwhile, writes that the Japanese issued considerably more than they recorded, and that – combined with money printed after the Japanese surrender – the actual total could be between 3.5 and 8 billion, with only 2.7 billion issued during the occupation.

In Portuguese Timor, the Banco Nacional Ultramarino allowed exchange of the gulden for Timorese pataca at par until 31 December 1954.

Coins
Known as the "Puppet Series" for each having depicted a distinctive traditional Indonesian shadow puppet, these coins were originally struck in tin with denominations of 1, 5, and 10 sen. They were dated 2604 using the classical Japanese imperial year calendar system, which equals 1943 in the Gregorian calendar. However, as the war began to turn against Japan her advantageous shipping routes were disrupted, and many coins destined towards the Indies were lost in transit due to heavy artillery fire and torpedoing of Japanese ships by Allied forces; this resulted in the series having never been issued. Most of the unused stock was later melted down and today very few specimens of any denomination survive.

Issuance

1942 (ND) Gulden Issue
The Japanese invasion money used in the Netherlands Indies was first denominated in Gulden (1942)  and later in Roepiah (1944–45).  The Gulden issue bears the payment obligation "De Japansche Regeering Betaalt Aan Toonder" (The Japanese Government pays to the bearer) on notes one-half Gulden and above. On smaller change notes (1–10 cents) it is shortened to “De Japansche Regeering”.  All Japanese invasion money used in the Netherlands Indies bear the block prefix letter “S” either followed by a number (lower denominations, 1–10 cents), a second letter, or as the numerator in a fractional block layout. Serial numbers were used for the initial printings of higher denomination notes (i.e., 1, 5, and 10 Gulden) but the printing machinery used by the Japanese after March 1943 (i.e., Kolff printing facility in Jakarta) did not allow for automatic sequential numbering thus the task was very slow and often resulted in multiple notes with the same serial number. By the middle of the second printing (the SB block) serial numbers were abandoned. Notes of one-half gulden and above are printed on paper watermarked with a repeating kiri flower.

1944 (ND) Roepiah Issue
First issued in September 1944, the "Dai Nippon Teikoku Seihu" notes (The Administration of the Japanese Troops) were denominated in Roepiah and printed entirely in Java.

1944-45 Roepiah Issue

Banknote table

Japanese gulden (1942)

Japanese roepiah (1944)

See also
Japanese military yen
Oceanian Pound
Japanese government-issued Philippine peso
Japanese government-issued rupee in Burma

References

Works cited 

 
 
 (Full PDF)
 Also published in: 

Dutch East Indies
Currencies of Indonesia
Economic history of Indonesia
Japanese occupation of the Dutch East Indies
Currencies introduced in 1944
1945 disestablishments in the Japanese colonial empire
1940s economic history